The Canton Register was an English language newspaper founded by Scottish merchants James Matheson and his nephew Alexander together with Philadelphian William Wightman Wood, the first editor. First published in Canton on 8 November 1827 and printed every two weeks, it was one of China's first English-language newspapers. Over the years, the publication was renamed The Hongkong Register and changed ownership shortly before ceasing operation in late 1850's. 

As of late 2018, there were unconfirmed plans for a digital media outlet of similar focus to be re-established by a descendant of Puankhequa to promote cross-border commerce.

References

Bibliography

External links
1835 Canton Register at Google Books

Publications established in 1827
Defunct newspapers published in China
Mass media in Guangzhou
Mass media in Macau
English-language newspapers published in China
1827 establishments in China